Fernando Fernández de Ovando was a Spanish diplomat and nobleman.

Life
Fernando Fernández de Ovando was a son of Hernán Pérez de Ovando and wife. He was a server of Ferdinand III of Castile and Alfonso X of Castile, the Wise, being his Ambassador at Rome, where he died.

He married and was the father of Fernando Fernández de Ovando, 1st Count of Torrelaguna and 1st Count of Uceda.

Sources
 Cunha, Fernando de Castro Pereira Mouzinho de Albuquerque e (1906–1998), Instrumentário Genealógico - Linhagens Milenárias. MCMXCV, p. 402

Spanish untitled nobility